{{Infobox character
| name           = Zangief (Зангиев)
| image          = Super Zangief.png
| caption        = Zangief in Super Street Fighter II. Drawn by Bengus
| series         = Street Fighter
| first          = Street Fighter II: The World Warrior (1991)
| based_on       = Victor Zangiev
| designer       = Akira "Akiman" Yasuda and Ikuo "Ikusan.Z" Nakayama (Street Fighter II)
| voice          = 
{{Collapsible list|title=Japanese
|Wataru Takagi (Street Fighter Alpha series, Marvel vs. Capcom series)
|Tesshō Genda (Capcom vs. SNK series, Capcom Fighting Evolution)
|Kenta Miyake (Street Fighter IV, Street Fighter X Tekken, Street Fighter V, Hi Score Girl, Street Fighter 6)
|Tetsuo Kanao (Street Fighter II: The Animated Movie)
|Yasuo Tanaka (Street Fighter II V)
|Hidenari Ugaki (Street Fighter Zero: The Animation)
|Ryūzaburō Ōtomo (Japanese television dub of the Street Fighter film)
|Katsuhisa Hōki (Japanese video and DVD dub of the Street Fighter film)
|Shin-ichiro Miki (Real Battle on Film)
|Minoru Hirota (Wreck-It Ralph)
}}
| motion_actor   = Andrew Bryniarski (The Movie games)
| portrayer      = Andrew Bryniarski (Street Fighter)
| origin         = Ossetian
| nationality    = Russian/Soviet
| fighting_style = SamboProfessional wrestling 
| occupation    = Professional wrestler
}}
Considered to be the first controllable fighting game character whose moveset is centered on grappling, he made his first appearance in Street Fighter II: The World Warrior in 1991. In the series, he is a professional wrestler that fights to prove Russia's superiority over other nations' fighters. He was the canon grand champion of Street Fighter IV, being the only character to defeat Seth.

Contrary to popular belief, the name Zangief is actually not of Russian, but Ossetian origin, being derived from an Eastern Slavic variant of the name Zanjiati.

Conception and creation

Designed by Akira Yasuda, Zangief was initially conceived for Street Fighter II as a character named "Vodka Gobalsky", planned to be a very strong but extremely slow character to play as. Early designs of the character closely resembled the character's finalized appearance, but with the addition of a black tanktop and anchor tattoo on his upper arms. In an interview with Game On!, Capcom Research and Development head Noritaka Funamizu stated that of the series' characters, Zangief was one of the most popular characters with American audiences, alongside Ryu and Guile.

Zangief appears as a tall, muscular man clad in red wrestling tights and boots, a studded gold belt, and red/gold wristbands. His brown hair is cut in a short mohawk style, and he has a beard/mustache and a large amount of hair on his chest. His arms and legs are covered with scars. His appearance is similar to real life professional wrestler Ivan Koloff.

Zangief has always been difficult to use because of his slow speed, lack of projectiles and his best moves require precise timing and difficult input controls. But that was not always the case. When Street Fighter II was being developed, the Capcom team placed a machine in a Tokyo arcade to assess the balancing issues between the characters. One unknown player got so good with Zangief, that he won 85 games in a row with him. In fact, other players wouldn’t even play the game because they feared him. "Regardless of how much we balanced Zangief in-house, this one Zangief expert would win all the time," Street Fighter II creator Yoshiki Okamoto says. Eventually, Zangief was nerfed so much, that this player would occasionally lose. “It is your fault, whoever you are, that Zangief has always been a specialty character!” Okamoto said.

Portrayal
Various actors have voiced the character in his video game appearances: he is voiced by Wataru Takagi in the Street Fighter Alpha and Street Fighter EX series, Tesshō Genda in the Capcom vs. SNK series and Capcom Fighting Evolution, and Kenta Miyake in Japanese and Peter Beckman in English for Street Fighter IV. In anime, he is voiced in Japanese by Tetsuo Kanao and in English by William Johnson. In the live-action Street Fighter film, the character was portrayed by Andrew Bryniarski, who was dubbed over by Ryūzaburō Ōtomo in the Japanese television dub and by Katsuhisa Hōki in the video and DVD dub. In the film Wreck-It Ralph, he was voiced by director Rich Moore. Zangief also appears as a playable character in Super Gem Fighter Mini Mix.

Appearances in other media
Zangief appeared in Masaomi Kanzaki's Street Fighter manga, which was released in the early 1990s. In his depiction in the comic, he was depicted very much like his video game self. One of his main motivations was to defeat Guile, who as an American, represented the rival country of Zangief's homeland, but found himself coming up short in their battles. In more recent adaptations, Zangief is shown to interact more with Ryu, either as an enemy or ally, and his win quotes in Street Fighter IV imply that it was Ryu who knocked him out of the second tournament.

Zangief appears in Masahiko Nakahira's Sakura Ganbaru! manga, in which he is introduced fighting in his exact same stage from Street Fighter Alpha 2. He first defeats Blanka, and then is engaged by Sakura and Cammy, whom he easily overpowered. He was later defeated by the duo and his friendly and good natured personality soon surfaced.

He appears as a playable character in the crossover fighting Street Fighter X Tekken, with his official tag partner, Rufus.

Zangief appears as a Spirit in the Nintendo crossover fighting game Super Smash Bros. Ultimate. After the player defeats Incineroar from Pokémon and rescue Zangief's spirit, they have access to a dojo where he can teach other spirits the "Overthrow" style.

Film and anime
Zangief appears in almost every Street Fighter movie adaptation to date, save for Street Fighter: The Legend of Chun-Li.

In Street Fighter II: The Animated Movie, Zangief appears very briefly during a brutal battle against Blanka to entertain an audience of crime bosses, where he is electrocuted by him, though his fate afterwards is unknown.

In Street Fighter II V, he is a henchman for Shadaloo, and sent by M. Bison to capture Ryu, whom he had seen displaying talents of Hadou on a beach earlier. Ryu resists, and they fight for a while until Zangief manages to knock him out. As they are leaving, Zangief spots Guile watching them from afar, and later on, while Guile and Nash are infiltrating Bison's base, Zangief corners Guile with the intention of killing him under Bison's orders. Guile and Zangief fight until Guile manages to knock Zangief out with a severe blow to the head. He is not seen again after for the rest of the anime, leaving his fate unknown when the base is destroyed after Ryu and Ken defeat Bison.

In Street Fighter Alpha: The Animation, he appears as a competitor in a fighting tournament. He fights Shun, Ryu's alleged little brother, and begins to ruthlessly beat the boy until Ryu intervenes and battles Zangief. Zangief appears to have the upper hand, but Ryu, in his rage, almost gives in to the Dark Hadō and fires a lethal dark Hadōken which narrowly misses Zangief but causes the building to collapse. Zangief, stunned by Ryu's power, subsequently falls through the crumbling floor.

In the live-action Street Fighter movie, Zangief is portrayed by Andrew Bryniarski. He is once again a lackey of Bison's, only this time he has a good heart (though he is extremely simple-minded) and truly believes Bison's propaganda that the A.N. are the enemies of world peace and freedom. Zangief gives Ryu and Ken their signature white and red gis, which are actually training uniforms for Bison's men. During the climactic battle, Zangief battles E. Honda. After the battle ends, he is told by Dee Jay that Bison was in fact the enemy and had been fooling Zangief the whole time. To redeem himself, Zangief helps Ryu and Ken hold the emergency exit door open for the hostages to escape. He is last seen complementing Guile's bravery and gives him the Bison salute, which Guile turns into a thumbs-up.

In popular culture
Zangief makes an appearance in the 2012 Walt Disney film Wreck-It Ralph, voiced by the film's director Rich Moore. He and M. Bison are among the game characters present at a meeting of "Bad-Anon", a villain support group, when Wreck-It Ralph decides to attend. Ralph later finds a pair of Zangief's tights in the lost-and-found box at Tapper's bar and reacts with disgust. Zangief appears again in the 2018 sequel Ralph Breaks the Internet where Ralph and Vanellope wonder how he only has hair on his chest, shins and face, and later at the end he attends a book club with Ralph, Sonic and Q*Bert. Strangely, despite appearing at "Bad-Anon", he is not a villain in his own video game series, although Street Fighter archvillain M. Bison is also shown in attendance. According to the film's writer,  who could never beat him as a kid, he attended the meeting because he felt bad for all the players that could never beat him. 

In the indie game Punch Club, a Russian fighter named Ivangief shares the same appearance as Zangief.

Reception
Zangief placed 18th in the Top 50 Characters of 1996 poll in the Gamest magazine in Japan. IGN ranked Zangief at 13th place in their list of top Street Fighter characters, stating "he's a bit of a stereotype, a hulking lug from Mother Russia, but he plays the type so well, though. Between the Mohawk, the muttonchops, and the all-over bear-wrestling scars, it is hard to imagine a more perfect embodiment of the muscle-bound grappling goon." GameDaily listed Zangief at number three in their list of top Street Fighter characters, describing his appearance as "menacing" as well as praising the strength of his fighting style. UGO Networks placed Zangief at number five on their list of top Street Fighter characters, stating "Zangief can be an intimidating character to play because he is far slower than other competitors; however, he makes up for that in his ability to close range quickly and bypass and counter projectiles from his opponents." Zangief ranked 26th in a worldwide Street Fighter character poll held between 2017 and 2018.

Zangief's appearance in the first polygonal Street Fighter game, Street Fighter EX, was criticized. Ed Lomas of Computer and Video Games ridiculed his "big square box-head" and GameSpot said he was the only one of the established Street Fighter characters in the game who didn't closely resemble his original 2D depiction. Next Generation'' said both the big characters in the game, Zangief and Darun, had awful polygonal models though they were very well-animated.

References

Capcom protagonists
Fictional professional wrestlers
Fictional Russian people in video games
Fictional Soviet people
Fictional sambo practitioners
Fictional Spetsnaz personnel
Male characters in video games
Street Fighter characters
Video game bosses
Video game characters introduced in 1991
Video game characters with superhuman strength